Pygmaepterys poormani is a species of sea snail, a marine gastropod mollusk in the family Muricidae, the murex snails or rock snails.

Description

Distribution

References

 Radwin, G. E.; d'Attilio, A. (1976). Murex shells of the World: An illustrated guide to the Muricidae. Stanford University Press.

Muricidae
Gastropods described in 1976